Alexandra Lahey (born 30 July 1992) is an Australian alternative rock singer-songwriter and multi-instrumentalist. Her debut album I Love You Like a Brother was released on 6 October 2017 and peaked at number 15 on the ARIA Albums Chart. Her second album, The Best of Luck Club followed in 2019, debuting at number 30. Following an EP issued during the COVID-19 pandemic in 2020, she will release her third record, The Answer Is Always Yes, in May 2023.

Early life
Alex Lahey was born in 1992 in Albert Park, a suburb of Melbourne, with her mother, Vicki, her father Bill and her brother, Will. At 13-years-old,  she started learning saxophone and guitar. She started university courses in both jazz and the arts but dropped out of the jazz component to join a local pop group, Animaux, on vocals and saxophone. After completing her arts degree Lahey decided to start a solo music career.

Career
In June 2016 Lahey won the Josh Pyke Partnership, for unsigned artists, which is co-sponsored by Pyke, Australasian Performing Right Association (APRA) and Australasian Mechanical Copyright Owners Society (AMCOS). She received a AUD$7500 grant, a song writing mentorship from Pyke and introduction to music industry officials. Lahey won the prize ahead of 200 entries and Pyke explained, "the song she submitted was immediately stuck in my head, and her lyrics were compelling and clever. Her turn of phrase was quirky and intelligent, and really relatable... I reckon most of us have been in the situation that's portrayed in the song 'You Don’t Think You Like People Like Me'."

"You Don't Think You Like People Like Me" also received Pitchfork's Best New Track Award, and it was listed in the Triple J Hottest 100 of 2016 at No. 97. Lahey subsequently won a Triple J Unearthed prize, leading to a performance slot at Splendour in the Grass and a nomination for a J Award as Unearthed Artist of the Year.

Lahey's debut extended play (EP), B-Grade University, was released on 29 July 2016, via Caroline Australia Records with distribution by Universal Music Australia. For the five tracks Lahey provided vocals, guitar, saxophone and keyboards; she was joined by Oscar Dawson on guitar, vocals, percussion and keyboards; Sam Humphrey on guitar; Kai Chen Lim on bass guitar; and Lachie McGeehan on drums. Dawson also produced, engineered and mixed the EP. It reached No. 95 on the ARIA Top 100 Physical Albums and No. 8 on the ARIA Hitseekers Albums charts.

In January 2017 Lahey signed to the Dead Oceans label, which re-released her EP. On 6 October 2017 she issued her debut album, I Love You Like a Brother, through her own independent label, Nicky Boy Records/Dead Oceans via Caroline Australia/Universal Music Australia. It reached No. 15 on the ARIA Albums Chart; Laura Stanley of Under the Radar observed, "[she] shares scenes from her own period of self-discovery, which makes for a fierce and incredibly fun debut full-length... the record standouts happen when Lahey and her bandmates zoom through spells of heartache with candidness and in a sharp pop-punk style."

I Love You Like a Brother was placed on several albums-of-the-year lists, including Bandcamp Daily (at No. 40), Noisey, the Sydney Morning Herald, Under the Radar, BrooklynVegan, and redbull.com. Spin Magazine would also cite the album as one of the magazine's 13 "Favorite Overlooked Albums of 2017". After touring Australia through October 2017, Lahey undertook an international tour of US and Europe from December 2017 and April 2018. At the ARIA Music Awards of 2018 she was nominated for Breakthrough Artist – Release.

In May 2019, Lahey released her second album 'The Best of Luck Club'. The album was produced by Catherine Marks along with Lahey. Lahey spent all of 2019 touring Australia, North America, Europe and the UK and had extensive touring plans for 2020 before they were cancelled due to the COVID-19 pandemic. The song "Misery Guts" from the album was featured in the video game Tony Hawk's Pro Skater 1+2.
 
In 2020, Lahey wrote and recorded the original song "On My Way" for Sony Pictures Animation's The Mitchells vs. the Machines, now Netflix’s biggest original animated release of all time. The song was also released on the official film soundtrack via Sony Classical.

On 21 October 2021, Lahey revealed she had signed with Liberation Records and released "Spike the Punch".

On 31 August 2022, Lahey released single "Congratulations" and announced national tour, commencing in October 2022. It'll be her first since 2019. Her third studio album, The Answer Is Always Yes, will release on 19 May 2023.

Personal life
Lahey identifies as gay. Her partner is fellow Australian musician Gordi. The two released a collaboration, "Dino's", in early 2021.

Discography

Studio albums

Extended plays

Singles

As lead artist

As featured artist

Production and Writing Discography

Awards and nominations

AIR Awards
The Australian Independent Record Awards (commonly known informally as AIR Awards) is an annual awards night to recognise, promote and celebrate the success of Australia's Independent Music sector.

|-
| rowspan="4" | AIR Awards of 2017
| rowspan="2" |herself
| Best Independent Artist
| 
|-
| Breakthrough Independent Artist
| 
|-
| B-Grade University
| Best Independent Album
| 
|-
| "You Don't Think You Like People Like Me"
| Best Independent Single or EP
| 
|-
| rowspan="3" | AIR Awards of 2018
| herself 
| Best Independent Artist
| 
|-
| I Love You Like a Brother 
| Best Independent Album
| 
|-
| "Every Day's the Weekend" 
| Best Independent Single or EP
| 
|-

APRA Awards
The APRA Awards are presented annually from 1982 by the Australasian Performing Right Association (APRA), "honouring composers and songwriters".

! 
|-
| 2018 
| "Everyday’s the Weekend"
| Song of the Year
| 
| 
|-

ARIA Music Awards

|-
| 2018
| I Love You Like a Brother
| Breakthrough Artist
| 
|-

J Award
The J Awards are an annual series of Australian music awards that were established by the Australian Broadcasting Corporation's youth-focused radio station Triple J. They commenced in 2005.

|-
| J Awards of 2016
| herself
| Unearthed Artist of the Year
| 
|-
| J Awards of 2017
| I Love You Like a Brother
| Australian Album of the Year
| 
|-

Music Victoria Awards
The Music Victoria Awards, are an annual awards night celebrating Victorian music. They commenced in 2005.

! 
|-
| rowspan="3"| 2016
| "You Don’t Think You Like People Like Me"
| Best Song
| 
| rowspan="5"|
|-
| rowspan="2"| herself
| Best Female Artist
| 
|-
| Best Emerging Artist
| 
|-
| 2018
| herself
| Best Solo Artist
| 
|-
| 2019
| herself
| Best Solo Artist
| 
|-
| 2021
| "Dino's" (with Gordi)
| Best Victorian Song
| 
|
|-

National Live Music Awards
The National Live Music Awards (NLMAs) are a broad recognition of Australia's diverse live industry, celebrating the success of the Australian live scene. The awards commenced in 2016.

|-
| National Live Music Awards of 2016
| herself
| The Heatseeker Award (Best New Act)
| 
|-
| rowspan="2" | National Live Music Awards of 2017
| rowspan="2" | herself
| International Live Achievement (Solo)
| 
|-
| People's Choice - Live Act of the Year
| 
|-
| rowspan="2" | National Live Music Awards of 2018
| rowspan="2" | herself
| International Live Achievement (Solo)
| 
|-
| Victorian Live Act of the Year
|

References

Australian rock singers
Living people
1992 births
21st-century Australian singers
Australian women singer-songwriters
Musicians from Melbourne
21st-century women musicians
Dead Oceans artists
Australian LGBT singers
21st-century LGBT people